Pollen Ndlanya (born 22 May 1970 in Daveyton) is a retired South African footballer who played as a striker.

He played for Kaizer Chiefs, Manning Rangers, Bursaspor, Göztepe, Amazulu and Orlando Pirates.

He also played for South Africa national football team at the 1997 FIFA Confederations Cup.

Career

Kaizer Chiefs
After training with Chiefs for two hours, Jeff Butler recommended that Ndlanya should be signed. He was spotted by Ryder Mofokeng at the Toyota U21 Championship in the Daveyton Highlanders vs Kaizer Chiefs match in 1991. He scored a header on debut against Pretoria Callies. His second spell at Chiefs after Manning Rangers proved to be more productive where he scored nine goals in two games, five against Manning Rangers and four against Total Aces.

Turkey
He had had difficulty coping in Turkey he couldn't communicate with teammates but only his coach and South African teammate, Gordon Mill and Fani Madida.

After Retirement
He is a head coach in the Vodacom League and owns a furniture business in Daveyton, Ideal Method Furnishers. He also hosts the Pollen Festive Games annually.

References

External links

1970 births
Living people
South African soccer players
South Africa international soccer players
South African expatriate soccer players
South African expatriate sportspeople in Turkey
1997 FIFA Confederations Cup players
1998 African Cup of Nations players
2000 African Cup of Nations players
Bursaspor footballers
Göztepe S.K. footballers
Kaizer Chiefs F.C. players
Orlando Pirates F.C. players
Süper Lig players
AmaZulu F.C. players
Expatriate footballers in Turkey
Manning Rangers F.C. players
Association football forwards